USS Gwin (DD-433), a , was the third ship of the United States Navy to be named for Lieutenant Commander William Gwin, an American Civil War officer who commanded river boats against Confederate forces in Alabama.

Gwin was launched on 25 May 1940 by the Boston Navy Yard; sponsored by Mrs. Jesse T. Lippincott, second cousin of Lt.Comdr. Gwin. The destroyer was commissioned at Boston on 15 January 1941. Gwin was sunk by a torpedo launched by a Japanese destroyer during the Battle of Kolombangara in the Solomon Islands Campaign in July 1943.

Service history
Gwin completed shakedown training on 20 April 1941 and underwent final alterations in the Boston Navy Yard before conducting a neutrality patrol throughout the Caribbean Sea. On 28 September 1941 she assumed identical service in the North Atlantic from her base at Hvalfjörður, Iceland. At the beginning of February 1942, she returned to the Eastern Seaboard through the Panama Canal to San Francisco, California.

Service in the Pacific Theatre

On 3 April 1942 Gwin stood out of San Francisco Bay as a unit of the escort for the aircraft carrier , which carried 16 Army B-25 bombers to be launched in a bombing raid on Tokyo. Admiral William F. Halsey in carrier  rendezvoused with the task force off Midway, and General Jimmy Doolittle's famed raiders launched the morning of 18 April when some 600 miles east of Tokyo. That battle concluded before the task force arrived, and Gwin returned to Pearl Harbor on 21 May for day and night preparations to meet the Japanese in the crucial battle for Midway Atoll.

Battle of Midway 
Gwin departed Pearl Harbor 23 May 1942 with Marine reinforcements for Midway and returned to port 1 June. Two days later she raced to join the Fast Carrier Task Force searching for the approaching Japanese fleet off Midway. The battle was all but concluded by the time she arrived on the scene on 5 June 1942. Four large Japanese aircraft carriers and a cruiser rested on the bottom of the sea along with some 250 enemy planes and their crews. Gwin sent a salvage party to assist in attempts to save carrier Yorktown, heavily damaged by two bomb and two torpedo hits in the Battle of Midway. As attempts continued 6 June 1942, a Japanese submarine rocked Yorktown with torpedo hits and sank the destroyer  which was secured alongside the carrier. The salvage party had to abandon Yorktown and surviving men were rescued from the sea, The carrier capsized and sank the morning of 7 June 1942. Gwin carried 102 survivors of the two ships to Pearl Harbor, arriving 10 June 1942.

Guadalcanal
Gwin departed Pearl Harbor 15 July 1942 to operate in the screen of fast carriers who pounded Japanese installations, troop concentrations and supply dumps as Marines invaded Guadalcanal in the Solomons on 7 August 1942. In the following months Gwin convoyed supply and troop reinforcements to Guadalcanal. Joining a cruiser–destroyer task force, she patrolled "the Slot" of water between the chain of Solomon Islands to intercept the "Tokyo Express" runs of supply, troop and warships supporting Japanese bases in the Solomons.

The following night the task group found the enemy off Savo Island: the battleship , four cruisers, 11 destroyers, and four transports, The Naval Battle of Guadalcanal was intensely fought. Gwin found herself in a gun duel between the light cruiser  and two Japanese destroyers ( and ), versus the four American destroyers. She took a shell hit in her engine room. Another shell struck her fantail and enemy torpedoes began to boil around the destroyers.

Though shaken by exploding depth charges, Gwin continued to fire at the enemy as long as any remained within range. In a short time the other three American destroyers were out of action; two sinking and  surviving with her bow partially destroyed. Gwin attempted to escort the nose-less Benham to Espiritu Santo, New Hebrides Islands. But when all hope was lost, survivors transferred to Gwin who sank Benhams abandoned hulk with gunfire. The survivors were landed 20 November at Nouméa, New Caledonia, and Gwin was routed onward to Hawaii, thence to the Mare Island Navy Yard, arriving 19 December 1942.

Later action in the Solomons

Having been overhauled, Gwin returned to the Southwest Pacific on 7 April 1943 to escort troop reinforcements and supplies throughout the Solomons. On 30 June she served with the massive amphibious assault force converging on New Georgia under the leadership of Rear Admiral Richmond K. Turner. Immediately after the first wave of troops hit Rendova Beach, Munda Island shore batteries opened fire on the four destroyers patrolling Blanche Channel. Gwin was straddled by the first salvo. A moment later a shell exploded on her main deck aft, killing three men, wounding seven and stopping her after engine. The half-dozen enemy shore batteries were soon silenced as Gwin laid down an effective heavy smoke screen to protect the unloading transports. When aerial raiders appeared, her gunners shot down three. Rendova Island was soon in American possession. It served as an important motor torpedo boat base to harass Japanese barge lines and a base for air support in the Solomons.

Sinking

Gwin escorted a reinforcement echelon from Guadalcanal to Rendova, then raced to the "Slot" 7 July to rescue 87 survivors of cruiser , lost in the Battle of Kula Gulf. She then joined a cruiser–destroyer task force under Rear Admiral Walden L. Ainsworth to head off a formidable "Tokyo Express" force headed through the Solomon Islands to land troops at Vila.  The Battle of Kolombangara was joined in the early hours of 13 July and Japanese light cruiser  quickly slid to the bottom, the victim of smothering gunfire and torpedo hits. However, four Japanese destroyers, waiting for a calculated moment when Ainsworth's formation would turn, launched 31 torpedoes at the American formation. His flagship, cruiser  and Gwin, maneuvering to bring their main batteries to bear on the enemy, turned right into the path of the "long lance" torpedoes. Both cruisers received damaging hits but survived. Gwin  received a torpedo hit amidships in her engine room and exploded. The destroyer  took off Gwins crew after their damage control efforts failed and she had to be scuttled. Two officers and 59 men perished with the destroyer.

Gwin received five battle stars for service in World War II.

References

Bibliography
Brown, David. Warship Losses of World War Two. Arms and Armour, London, 1990.  .

External links 
USS Gwin website at Destroyer History Foundation
Naval History and Heritage Command: USS Gwin
   navsource.org: USS Gwin
        hazegray.org: USS Gwin
Roll of Honor

 

Gwin (DD-433)
Ships built in Boston
Shipwrecks in the Solomon Sea
1940 ships
Gwin (DD-433)
Maritime incidents in July 1943